Presidio Med is an American medical drama television series created by John Wells and Lydia Woodward (who also executive produced NBC's ER), that aired on CBS from September 24, 2002 to January 24, 2003. The series centers on a San Francisco hospital.

Premise
Bucking the recent medical trend toward impersonal care, the doctors at Presidio Medical Group set bureaucracy aside and put their patients first, forming trusting, long-term relationships. Although their personalities sometimes clash, all of the doctors seek the best possible care for their patients.

Cast
 Dana Delany as Dr. Rae Brennan
 Sasha Alexander as Dr. Jackie Colette
 Paul Blackthorne as Dr. Matt Slingerland
 Blythe Danner as Dr. Harrient Lanning
 Anna Deavere Smith as Dr. Letty Jordan
 Oded Fehr as Dr. Nicolas Kokoris
 Julianne Nicholson as Dr. Jules Keating
 Jennifer Siebel as Cyndy Lloyd

Awards and nominations
In 2004, actress Hallie Kate Eisenberg was nominated for a Young Artist Award for Best Performance in a TV Series in the category Guest Starring Young Actress for her performance as Grace Rothman in the episode "With Grace".

Episodes

References

External links
 

2002 American television series debuts
2003 American television series endings
2000s American drama television series
2000s American medical television series
CBS original programming
English-language television shows
Television series by Warner Bros. Television Studios
Television shows set in San Francisco